The 1979 Miami Hurricanes football team represented the University of Miami as an independent during the 1979 NCAA Division I-A football season. Led by first-year head coach Howard Schnellenberger, the Hurricanes played their home games at the Miami Orange Bowl in Miami, Florida. Miami finished the season with a record of 5–6.

Schedule

Personnel

Game summaries

Alabama

Statistics

Passing

Rushing

Receiving

References

Miami
Miami Hurricanes football seasons
Miami Hurricanes football